The Ministry of Justice and Human Rights of Togo oversees institutions and bodies such as the following: 

 Center for the Training of the Professions of Justice (CFPJ)
 National Commission of OHADA
 Courts and tribunals
 Interministerial commission for drafting initial and periodic reports on human rights 
 National human rights institutions, civil society organizations and the public and private media 
 Humanitarian law 

The following responsibilities are assigned to the Minister of Justice and Human Rights: 

 General inspectorate of judicial and penitentiary services 
 The person responsible for public procurement; 
 The public procurement commission; 
 The commission of control of the public markets

List of ministers (Post-1960 upon achieving independence) 

Sylvanus Olympio (1960-1961)
Andre Kuevidjen (1963-1966)
 Leonidas Kouassi (1967)
 Kleber Dadjo (1967-1969)
 Janvier Chango (1969-1974)
Nanamale Gbegbeni (1974-1977)
Issa Sama (1977-1978)
Bibi Yao Savi de Tove (1978-1980) [1st female]
Akanyi Awunyo Kodjovi (1980-1982)
Ayivi Mawuko Ajavon (1982-1986)
Anani Mawugbe (1986-1987)
Kpotivi Tevi Djidjogbe Lacle (1987-1989)
Bitokotipou Yagninim (1990)
Koami Kuma Alfred Tordjo (1991-1992)
Arégba Polo (1993)
Kangni Gabriel Akakpovie (1994)
Elliott Latévi-Atcho Lawson (1995-1996)
Stanislaus Somolu Baba (1997-1999) [Bitokotipou Yagninim, 1998]
Seye Memene (1999-2002)
 Katari Foli-Bazi (2002-2005)
 Tchessa Abi (2005-2009)
 Biossey Tozoun (2009-2011)
Tchitchao Tchalim (2011-2014)
Kofi Esaw (2014-2017)
Pius Agbetomey (2017-present)

See also 

 Justice ministry
 Politics of Togo

References 

Justice ministries
Government of Togo